The 2023 North Greenville Crusaders men's volleyball team represents North Greenville University in the 2023 NCAA Division I & II men's volleyball season. The Crusaders, led by first year head coach Matthew McManaway, were picked to win the Conference Carolinas title in the coaches preseason poll.

Season highlights
Will be filled in as the season progresses.

Roster

Schedule
TV/Internet Streaming information:
All home games will be streamed on Conference Carolinas DN. Most road games will also be televised or streamed by the schools television or streaming service.

 *-Indicates conference match.
 Times listed are Eastern Time Zone.

Announcers for televised games
Queens: Alan Kahaly
Tusculum: 
Limestone: 
Harvard: 
Limestone: 
Campbellsville:
King: 
Barton: 
Belmont Abbey: 
Lees-McRae: 
Erskine: 
Emmanuel: 
George Mason: 
Lees-McRae: 
Tusculum: 
Reinhardt: 
NJIT: 
King: 
Mount Olive: 
Barton: 
Erskine: 
Emmanuel:
Belmont Abbey:

References

2023 in sports in South Carolina
2023 NCAA Division I & II men's volleyball season
North Greenville